Méline Nocandy  (born 25 February 1998) is a French female handballer for Paris 92 and the French national team.

She represented France at the 2019 World Women's Handball Championship.

Achievements
French Championship:
Winner: 2016, 2017, 2018, 2019, 2022
French Cup:
Winner: 2017, 2019, 2022
EHF Champions League:
Bronze: 2022
EHF Junior European Championship:
Gold Medalist: 2017

References

External links

1998 births
Living people
French female handball players
Guadeloupean female handball players
People from Saint-Claude, Guadeloupe
Black French sportspeople
French people of Guadeloupean descent
Handball players at the 2020 Summer Olympics
Medalists at the 2020 Summer Olympics
Olympic medalists in handball
Olympic gold medalists for France